The Return of the Prodigal Son is a 1966 Czechoslovak drama film directed by Evald Schorm. The film won Special Mention at Locarno International Film Festival in 1967.

Synopsis

Cast
 Jan Kačer as Jan Šebek
 Jana Brejchová as Jana Šebková
 Jiří Menzel as Jiří
 Milan Morávek as Doctor
 Dana Medřická as Olga
 Anna Lebedová as Jana's mother
 Antonín Lebeda as Jana's father
 Jiřina Třebická as Nurse
 Jiří Kylián as Dancer Zdeněk
 Nina Divíšková as Young patient

Release
in 2012, the film was released on DVD by The Criterion Collection as a part of the Eclipse Series compilatio Pearls of the Czech New Wave.

References

External links
 
 

Czech drama films
Czechoslovak drama films
1967 drama films
1967 films
Czechoslovak black-and-white films
Films directed by Evald Schorm
1960s Czech-language films
1960s Czech films